Tarnaboyevo is a rural locality (a village) in Zaboryinskoye Rural Settlement, Beryozovsky District, Perm Krai, Russia. The population was 12 as of 2010.

Geography 
Tarnaboyevo is located on the Shakva River, 17 km southwest of  Beryozovka (the district's administrative centre) by road. Karnaukhovo is the nearest rural locality.

References 

Rural localities in Beryozovsky District, Perm Krai